(abbreviated VAdm) is a senior naval flag officer rank in several German-speaking countries, equivalent to Vice admiral.

Austria-Hungary 

In the Austro-Hungarian Navy there were the flag-officer ranks Kontreadmiral (also spelled Konterdmiral in the 20th century), Viceadmiral , and Admiral, as well as Großadmiral.

Belgium 

Germany

Rank insignia and rating 
Its rank insignia, worn on the sleeves and shoulders, are one five-pointed star above a big gold stripe and two normal ones (without the star when rank loops are worn). It is grade B8 in the pay rules of the Federal Ministry of Defence.

The sequence of ranks (top-down approach) in that particular group is as follows:
OF-9: Admiral (Germany) / General (Germany)
OF-8: Vizeadmiral / Generalleutnant
OF-7: Konteradmiral / Generalmajor
OF-6: Flottillenadmiral / Brigadegeneral

History

Imperial German Navy and Kriegsmarine 

The rank insignia consisted of shoulder strap and sleeve stripes. Shoulder straps had to be worn on uniform jackets and consisted of twisted gold-braids (one pip or star) on padding in navy blue weapon color.

Cuff insignia consisted of one golden big stripe, two normal stripes, and a five-point naval star above. The sleeve rings encircled the lower cuffs.

National People's Army

Vizeadmiral was the second lowest flag officer grade of the Volksamarine, equivalent to the Generalleutnant.

In the GDR Volksmarine there were 3 flag officer ranks: Konteradmiral, Vizeadmiral, and Admiral. The GDR State Council decided 25 March 1982 to introduce the rank of Flottenadmiral.

Insignia

References

 

Naval ranks
Naval ranks of Germany
Admirals
Two-star officers of Nazi Germany
Three-star officers of the Bundeswehr

ru:Вице-адмирал